Savignyellidae is a family of bryozoans belonging to the order Cheilostomatida.

Genera:
 Enteleia
 Halysisis Norman, 1909
 Savignyella Levinsen, 1909

References

Cheilostomatida